Sribhashyam Vijayasarathi (10 March 1936 – 28 December 2022) was an Indian author, Sanskrit grammarian, philosopher and critic.

He was the recipient of India's highly prestigious award Padma Shri for the year 2020 for his excellent work in the field of Literature and Education.

Early life and education
Sribhashyam Vijayasarathi was born to Narasimhacharya, Gopamamba on 10 March 1936 at Chegurthi village, Karimnagar district, Telangana. Vijayasarathi started composing poetry at the age of 7. Although he had his primary education in Urdu medium, excelled himself as a Sanskrit scholar extraordinarily.

It was his mother who taught him "Nyaya Bodhini", "Tharka Sangrahamu", and Meemamsa. It was during this period that he composed "Sharadaa Padakinkine". His astounding scholarship came to fore with khandakavyas like "Vishaadalahari" and "Shabaree Paridevanam" which he composed at the age of sixteen.

Vijayasarathi introduced ‘seesam’, a Telugu poetic form and he was the first man who introduced epistolary form in Sanskrit. He came into the limelight for his work Mandakini and using the maximum number of ‘dhatus' in his poetry.

Awards and recognition
Padma Shri award for the year 2020 in the field of Literature and Education for the state Telangana
K. K. Birla Foundation "Vachaspati Puraskar" for the year  1996 in Jaipur
Tilak Maharashtra Vidyapeeth awarded "Indira Behere" gold medal award for the year 1995 in Pune
Vishishta Sahithya Puraskaram by Government of Telangana -2017
Mahakavi title by former speaker of Andhra Pradesh Sri Ayyadevara Kaleswara Rao
Swarna Kankanam by the then Governor of Andhra pradesh Late Sri Krishan Kant
Kavichakravathi title by D. Sripada Rao, Ex. Speaker AP legislative Assembly
Mahamahopaadhyaya – National Sanskrit University - Tirupati (2018)
Uthama Samskritha Panditha Puraskaaram – Telugu University – Hyderabad
Sanathana Dharma Charitable Trust – Ugadi Puraskaaram through the hands of Sadguru Shivananda Murthy
Appajosyula Vishnubhotla Kandalam foundation Pratibha Murthy Jeevithakala Sadhana Puraskaram-2021 in Hyderabad

In his honor
Sribhashyam Vijayasarathi National Sanskrit Award is awarded every year. This award carries a cash reward of Rs.25000, Mangala Vastram and a Memento to a Sanskrit poet on the occasion of Sribhashyam Vijayasarathi's birthday.

Bibliography
Sribhashyam Vijayasarathi had written more than 100 books in Sanskrit and Telugu like Mandakini, Bharathabharathi, Raasakeli, Rochishmathi, Praveena Bharatham, Vishadalahari, Sangeetha Madhavam, Prahelikalu, Sharada Padakinkinkini, Geetanjali (Sanskrit translation of Rabindranath Tagore's Geetanjali), Manorama (Novel) and Shusheela (Novel) to name a few. He was instrumental in writing about the history and culture of India in lucid Sanskrit. He had left no genre untouched in Sanskrit. He was a spiritual humanist and progressive writer. He had been rendering yeoman service in spreading the Sanskrit language by conducting free Sanskrit classes, organizing Vidwat Sabhas, poetic symposia and publishing booklets on different issues of Sanatana Dharma.

Philanthropy
Sribhashyam Vijayasarathi formed a platform called Sarvavaidka Samsthanam at Karimnagar of Telangana State in the year 1980 to take up literary, social and spiritual activities. He carried out various programs in a rare manner from this platform successfully. He conducted free spoken Sanskrit classes to popularize the Sanskrit language. He also organized Vidwat Sabhas every year. Vijayasarathi also conducts poetic symposia every year to encourage the budding poets in Sanskrit.

Sarvavadikika Samsthanam, in addition to spreading vedic knowledge, serving Sanskrit language, setting up Aarsha Dharma, also takes responsibility of maintaining the Yagnavaraha Kshetram temple which was established by Sribhashyam Vijayasarathi in 1986. He performed many Yagnas, for the well-being of the society, in the premises of Yagnavaraha Kshetram, Karimnagar.

References

External links

1936 births
2022 deaths
Recipients of the Padma Shri in literature & education
Writers from Telangana
Sanskrit grammarians
People from Karimnagar district